The Paraguay national futsal team represents Paraguay during international futsal competitions and is controlled by a branch of the Paraguayan Football Association (Asociación Paraguaya de Fútbol). Its biggest accomplishment is becoming champions of the AMF Futsal World Cup on three occasions (1988, 2003, 2007).

Results and fixtures

The following is a list of match results in the last 12 months, as well as any future matches that have been scheduled.
Legend

2021

Players

Current squad
The following players were called up to the Paraguay squad for the 2022 Futsal Finalissima.
Head coach: Carlos Chilavert

Recent call-ups
The following players have also been called up to the squad within the last 12 months.

COV Player withdrew from the squad due to contracting COVID-19.
INJ Player withdrew from the squad due to an injury.
PRE Preliminary squad.
RET Retired from international futsal.

Competitive record

FIFA Futsal World Cup

FIFUSA/AMF Futsal World Cup
1982 -  Second place
1985 -  Third place
1988 -  Champions
1991 -  Second place
1994 - Quarterfinals
1997 - did not play
2000 - Second round
2003 -  Champions (host)
2007 -  Champions
2011 -  Second place
2015 -  Second place
2019 - TBD

South American Futsal Championship
1965 -  Champions (host)
1969 -  Second place (host)
1971 -  Third place
1973 -  Third place
1975 -  Third place
1976 -  Second place
1977 -  Second place
1979 - did not play
1983 -  Second place
1986 -  Second place
1989 -  Second place
1992 -  Third place
1995 - Fourth place
1996 - Fourth place
1997 -  Third place
1998 -  Second place
1999 -  Second place
2000 - First round
2003 -  Third place (host)
2008 - Fourth place
2011 -  Third place
2015 -  Second place
2017 -  Third place
2022 -  Second place

FIFA Futsal World Cup qualification (CONMEBOL)
2012 -  Second place
2016 -  Third place (host)

Grand Prix de Futsal
2005 – Fifth place
2006 – did not play
2007 – Twelfth place
2008 – Fourth place
2009 – Eighth place
2010 –  Bronze medal
2011 – Sixth place
2013 – Fourth place
2014 – did not play
2015 – Fourth place

Futsal Mundialito
1994 – did not play
1995 – did not play
1996 –  Second place
1998 – did not play
2001 – did not play
2002 – did not play
2006 – did not play
2007 – did not play
2008 – did not play

Honours
AMF Futsal World Cup
Winners (3): 1988, 2003, 2007
South American Futsal Championship
Winners (1): 1965
Futsal Mundialito
Silver Medal (1): 1996
Pan American Games
Bronze Medal (1): 2007
Grand Prix de Futsal
Bronze Medal (1): 2010
Bolivarian Games
Winners (1): 2013
Silver Medal (1): 2022

See also
Paraguay national football team

References

External links
 Historia de Futsal (APF)

South American national futsal teams
Futsal
National